Steve Livermont  (born December 13, 1955) is a Native American politician and rancher, who served as a Republican member of the South Dakota House of Representatives, representing the 27th district from 2017 until 2021.  He chose not to seek reelection in 2020. During his time in the legislature, he was the only Native American Republican present in the State House, until 2018 when Republican Tamara St. John, a Sisseton Sioux, was elected. He lives in Martin.

Electoral history

In 2016, Incumbent Representative Kevin Killer decided to run for the South Dakota Senate leaving one of the two seats open in district 27. Livermont and Incumbent Representative May were unopposed in the June Republican Primary. 

In the 2016 District 27 General Election, Livermont and May faced Democrats Red Dawn Foster and State Senator Jim Bradford, as well as Independent Everette McKinley. The election ended with Incumbent May taking the first seat and Livermont taking the second.

In 2018, Incumbents Liz Marty May and Steve Livermont decided to run again and were unopposed the June Republican Primary. 

In the 2018 District 27 General Election, Livermont and May will face Democrats Margaret Ross and Perri Pourier .

References 

1955 births
Living people
Native American state legislators in South Dakota
Oglala people
Republican Party members of the South Dakota House of Representatives
Ranchers from South Dakota
People from Bennett County, South Dakota
21st-century American politicians
21st-century Native Americans